Michael Joseph Juneau (born June 29, 1962) is a Senior United States district judge of the United States District Court for the Western District of Louisiana.

Biography 

Juneau was born on June 29, 1962, in Monroe, Louisiana. He received his Bachelor of Science, magna cum laude, from Louisiana State University and his Juris Doctor, cum laude, from Harvard Law School, where he was selected as the best oralist in the Ames Moot Court Competition.

As a lawyer at his Lafayette-based litigation firm Juneau David, he handled a broad range of civil litigation in state and federal courts across Louisiana. He also has extensive experience administering mass tort settlements as a court-appointed neutral in significant mass tort and nationwide class action matters. In this capacity, he managed some of the largest multi-district litigation in the United States, including In Re: Vioxx Products Liability Litigation and In Re: Oil Spill by the Rig "Deepwater Horizon" in the Gulf of Mexico on April 20, 2010.

Federal judicial service 

On August 3, 2017, President Donald Trump nominated Juneau to serve as a United States District Judge of the United States District Court for the Western District of Louisiana, to the seat vacated by Judge Richard T. Haik, who assumed senior status on March 6, 2015. Juneau's nomination carried the support of U.S. Senators Bill Cassidy and John Neely Kennedy. On October 4, 2017, a hearing on his nomination was held before the Senate Judiciary Committee. On October 26, 2017, his nomination was reported out of committee by an 11–9 roll call vote.

On January 3, 2018 his nomination was returned to the President under Rule XXXI, Paragraph 6 of the United States Senate. On January 5, 2018, Trump announced his intent to renominate Juneau to a federal judgeship. On January 8, 2018, his renomination was sent to the Senate. On January 18, 2018, his nomination was reported out of committee by an 11–10 vote. On October 11, 2018, his nomination was confirmed by a 54–41 vote. He received his judicial commission on October 17, 2018. He assumed senior status on February 1, 2022 due to a certified disability.

References

External links 
 

1962 births
Living people
20th-century American lawyers
21st-century American lawyers
21st-century American judges
Alliance Defending Freedom people
Harvard Law School alumni
Judges of the United States District Court for the Western District of Louisiana
Louisiana lawyers
Louisiana Republicans
Louisiana State University alumni
People from Lafayette, Louisiana
People from Monroe, Louisiana
United States district court judges appointed by Donald Trump